Zhang Taofang, was a Chinese sniper. He is credited with making 214 kills in 32 days during the Korean War.

Korean War
Zhang deployed to Triangle Hill with the 8th company, 214th Regiment, 24th Corps on 11 January 1953; he had been part of the army for less than two years. He was armed with an old Mosin–Nagant without a PU scope.

18 days later Zhang spotted a target. He immediately aimed, fired, and missed 12 times, and was nearly killed by counter-fire. Based on that experience, Zhang refined his aiming technique with the iron sight, and the next time he fired, he hit the target. On February 15, he hit 7 targets with 9 rounds, a ratio surpassing many experienced snipers.

According to a publicity photograph, Zhang made 214 kills in 32 days winning him a first class merit.

Post war
After the end of the Korean War in 1954, Zhang was transferred to the People's Liberation Army Air Force (PLAAF), and was sent to study at the PLAAF aviation schools in Xuzhou and Jinan. In 1956, he joined the Communist Party of China and worked as a fighter pilot at the Air Force Training Base in Gaomi, where he flew MiG-15 and MiG-15bis trainers.  Under the instructions of PLAAF commander Liu Yalou, Zhang was appointed as the battalion commander of an air defense force. Later, he served as deputy instructor of the guard company of an air base, student at the Shanghai Air Force Political School, instructor of the guard company of Weixian Air Base in Shandong and deputy chief of staff of the Ninth Surface-to-Air Missile Regiment Command. He retired from military service in 1985.

Zhang died on 29 October 2007.

Awards
:
 Combat Hero (Second class)
:
 Order of the National Flag (First class)

References

Chinese military personnel of the Korean War
Military snipers
1931 births
2007 deaths
People's Liberation Army Air Force personnel
People from Xinghua, Jiangsu